Kelly-Moore Paints is an American paint manufacturing company founded in 1946 by William Kelly and William Moore. It is based in San Carlos, California.

The company has stores located in California, Texas, Oklahoma, and Nevada. Hurst, Texas is their only manufacturing plant.

History

1946–1952: Founding the company 
Kelly-Moore Paints was founded in 1946 by William Kelly and William Moore, former Glidden employees.

1952–1984: Acquistion by William Moore and expansion of the business 
Moore bought out Kelly in 1952, and for the next thirty years he was actively involved in every facet of the business.  He played an essential role in the evolution of production methods and the planning and designing of company-owned stores. 

In 1974, in terms of revenue, retail sales made up almost 25 percent of the total revenue. As a result of market shifts, that percentage would increase to 37 percent within a decade. There was a rise in the number of homeowners who wanted to paint their own homes. Kelly-Moore maintained annual growth of 13 percent over the past decade.

In 1984, Kelly-Moore had a revenue of $136 million and a profit of almost $11 million, when Moore announced retirement.

1984–1998: Company under a new management 
In 1998, Moore and his wife set up an ESOP, which was a retirement and stock ownership plan for eligible workers.

Joseph P. Cristiano took over as CEO of Kelly-Moore in January 1985, six months after William Moore retired. During those months, he spent shadowing sales representatives to learn the ropes.

In 1994, Kelly-Moore Paints expanded its presence in Alaska and Washington by acquiring Preservative Paint Co. of Seattle. The purchase created a wholly owned subsidiary of Kelly-Moore Paints with two new retail locations in Alaska and fifteen new retail locations in Washington.

In 1995, Kelly-Moore acquired K-M Universal, expanding its presence in the Southwest by adding a factory in Tempe, Arizona, and a number of retail outlets in the state of Arizona and the state of California. A year later, Kelly-Moore expanded its new subsidiary by absorbing another acquisition, the paint division of Island Equipment Co., situated in Guam.

1998–2022: ESOP 
In 1998, Moore and his wife set up an ESOP in 1998, which was a retirement and stock ownership plan for eligible workers.

In 1999, Kelly-Moore partnered with M.A. Bruder & Sons, a Pennsylvania-based company with a business model and customer base comparable to its own, in an effort to strengthen both firms' positions in the marketplace.  They were both able to serve national accounts since their regions did not overlap; M.A. Bruder handled projects on the East Coast, while Kelly-Moore handled those on the West Coast.  As a result of the collaboration, both businesses were included beside each other in the American Institute of Architects' MasterSpec Finishes directory, which is used by some 5,500 architectural and construction firms. 

In 2000, Diamond Vogel Paints and later Dunn-Edwards joined their alliance which was known as Paints America. In the same year, Kelly-Moore Paints acquired Ponderosa Paint Manufacturing.

In January 2003, Herb R. Giffins replaced Cristiano as the new president and CEO of Kelly-Moore Paints. 

In April 2022, Kelly-Moore Paint Company received Governor's Texas Environmental Excellence Award in Pollution Prevention category.

2022–present: Acquistion by Flacks Group 
In September 2022  Kelly Moore Paints was acquired by Flacks Group, a Miami, Florida-based investment firm that holds more than $2 billion of total assets.

Management
 William Moore (until 1984) 
 Joseph P. Cristiano (1985–2003)
 Herb R. Giffins
 Steve DeVoe

Awards and recognition
 2022: Governor's Texas Environmental Excellence Award

References

Further reading
 Bjerklie, Steve, "Leading with Service", Modern Paint and Coatings, October 1, 2000, p. 40.
 Dill, Larry, "Paint Recycling: Kelly-Moore Is Supplying the Federal Government and Looking for Other Markets", Modern Paint and Coatings, January 1, 1995, p. 19.
 Neal, Roger, "Color It Profitable", Forbes, January 28, 1985, p. 76.
 Reitter, Chuck, "There Are No Ivory Towers in San Carlos, California", American Paint & Coatings Journal, February 3, 1986, p. 42.
 Valero, Greg, and Bill Schmitt, "Regional Paint Makers Link to Serve National Accounts", Chemical Week, May 17, 2000, p. 39.

External links
Official Website

Paint and coatings companies of the United States
Chemical companies established in 1946
1946 establishments in California
Retail companies established in 1946